Friedrich Philippi may refer to:

 Friedrich Adolf Philippi (1809–1882), Lutheran theologian
 Friedrich Philippi (historian) (1853–1930), German archivist and historian